Anthony W. Batts (born 1960) is an American law enforcement officer who served as the chief of three different police departments in the United States: The Long Beach, California Police Department, the Oakland, California Police Department, and the Baltimore, Maryland Police Department.

Early life and education
Batts was born in Washington D.C. and lived there until he was 5 years old when his family relocated to San Francisco and then several years later Los Angeles. He grew up in South Los Angeles .

Batts has earned a Doctorate in Public Administration, a Master in Business Management, and a Bachelor of Science in Law Enforcement Administration.

Career

2000s
Batts was chief of police for the Californian cities of Oakland and Long Beach. He worked in the Long Beach Police Department for 27 years, rising to Chief of Police in 2002.  Under Batts, homicides decreased 45% and overall crime decreased 13% in Long Beach. The drop in violent crime rate in the city was the lowest in nearly 40 years. He led the police department for seven years.

In 2006, as chief of police in Long Beach, Batts became embroiled in "lobstergate": three officers reported colleagues for fishing for lobsters while on duty. Batts allegedly called the reporting officers "malcontents" and forced them into a variety of bad assignments in retribution. The officers sued and won a case against LBPD & Batts in 2008 and were awarded $1 million each by a jury. Batts left Long Beach PD shortly afterwards.

Batts has said that he was motivated to seek the Oakland Chief of Police job by the aftermath of the killing of four Oakland police officers in March 2009. He was appointed Chief of Police in late 2009. In mid 2011 Batts applied to the San Jose Police Department without informing the Mayor of his intention to leave. Having lost confidence of both the Mayor and the rank-and-file officers he resigned in October 2011. After his departure the Oakland Police Department achieved significant reductions in violent crime which had risen steadily during his 2009-2011 tenure.

2010s
After a brief period in a research post at Harvard, Batts became the police commissioner of the Baltimore Police Department on September 27, 2012. During his tenure in Baltimore, his team was able to implement reforms that led to dramatic reductions in all metrics used to assess police performance, including overall declines in all Part I crime numbers, excessive force objections, and citizen complaints.

On December 23, 2014, Batts was named in a lawsuit by a whistle blower in the Baltimore Police Department for failing to protect the officer from retaliation for reporting severe brutality. The suit was settled on June 1, 2016 (after Batts was fired) for $42,000.

On July 8, 2015, Batts was fired from the Baltimore Police Department in the aftermath of a spike in homicide rates weeks after the 2015 Baltimore riots. Reports also cited the controversial handling of Freddie Gray's arrest as the cause of Batt's removal. Gray died in police custody.

Batts has received various awards and commendations for heroism, crime reduction, community activism, and innovative programs, including California State University Long Beach Alumni of the Year, Boy Scouts of America Distinguished Citizen Award in the cities of Long Beach and Oakland, and Leadership Long Beach Alumnus of the Year. Batts was also honored by the Anti-Defamation League for community outreach efforts to erase antisemitism, bigotry, and other such intolerances. He has served on the following boards: Long Beach Memorial Hospital Board of Trustees; Board of Governors for Long Beach City College; Board of Directors for the Boy Scouts of America; and the Long Beach Children's Clinic.

Dr. Batts currently serves as an instructor at the FBI-Law Enforcement Executive Development Association.

Personal life
Batts's former wife is Laura Richardson, a Californian Democrat and former member of the United States House of Representatives.

References

External links

Q&A interview with Batts, c-span.org, March 1, 2015.

1960 births
Living people
Law enforcement workers from California 
Commissioners of the Baltimore Police Department
Chiefs of the Oakland Police Department